Guljonoy Naimova (born 1 January 2001) is an Uzbekistani para taekwondo practitioner. She won the gold medal in the women's +58 kg event at the 2020 Summer Paralympics in Tokyo, Japan.

References

Living people
2001 births
Place of birth missing (living people)
Uzbekistani female taekwondo practitioners
Taekwondo practitioners at the 2020 Summer Paralympics
Medalists at the 2020 Summer Paralympics
Paralympic gold medalists for Uzbekistan
Paralympic medalists in taekwondo
21st-century Uzbekistani women